The 1884 Illinois gubernatorial election was held on November 4, 1884.

Republican nominee Richard J. Oglesby defeated Democratic nominee Carter Harrison Sr. with 49.63% of the vote. Oglesby's victory was the eighth consecutive victory for the Republican Party.

Republican John C. Smith was elected Lieutenant Governor of Illinois. At this time in Illinois history, the Lieutenant Governor was elected on a separate ballot from the governor. This would remain so until the 1970 constitution.

General election

Candidates
Carter Harrison Sr., Democratic, incumbent Mayor of Chicago
Richard J. Oglesby, Republican, former Governor and former U.S. Senator
Jesse Harper, Greenback, former Party chairman, Greenback nominee for Illinois's 14th congressional district in 1878
James Bartlett Hobbs, Prohibition

Results

References

Bibliography
  
 

Governor
1884
Illinois
November 1884 events